Petar "Pero" Brzica (born ca. 1917) was a Croatian Franciscan of the "Order of Friars Minor" who became a mass murderer during the Ustaše regime. He committed his atrocities at the Jasenovac concentration camp during World War II.

Background
Before the war, Brzica was a scholarship student at the Franciscan college of Široki Brijeg in Herzegovina and a member of The Great Brotherhood of Crusaders, an organization part of the Croatian Catholic movement. He spent some time studying law in Zagreb where he became a Ustaše Youth member, later becoming a member of the fascist Ustaša government (1941–45) and one of the guards in the Jasenovac concentration camp.

As a member of Ustaša, he held the rank of Lieutenant. He won a contest in which he used a curve-bladed knife, also called a srbosjek ("Serb-cutter"), to kill newly arrived concentration camp prisoners. Brzica boasted of winning the contest by killing the largest number of prisoners – 1,360 people. Other sources set Brzica's "record" at a lower number, between 670 and 1,100.

See also
 Independent State of Croatia
 Ivica Matković (Ustaša)
 List of fugitives from justice who disappeared
 Ljubo Miloš
 Miroslav Filipović

References

Sources
 
 
 

1910s births
Catholicism and far-right politics
Croatian nationalists
Fugitives
Holocaust perpetrators in Yugoslavia
Genocide of Serbs in the Independent State of Croatia perpetrators
People of the Independent State of Croatia
Possibly living people
Ustaše
Ustaše concentration camp personnel
Year of death unknown
Croatian mass murderers